Hantz Group is a business financial services conglomerate in the U.S. founded by John Hantz. The company operates in Michigan and Ohio with offerings including banking, casualty insurance, financial planning, health benefit plans, retirement plans for companies, estate planning, and tax services. It also operates the Hantz Farms farming division. It is based in Southfield, Michigan.

Hantz Farms
The Hantz Farms division is working to develop Hantz Woodlands, an urban farm in Detroit, with the purchase of a area of mostly abandoned homes to redeveloped into park. It would be the largest urban farm in the U.S.

References

Financial services companies of the United States
Companies based in Michigan
Southfield, Michigan